The Embassy of Nigeria in Washington, D.C. is the diplomatic mission of the Federal Republic of Nigeria to the United States.

Its chancery is located on a crest of a hill at 3519 International Court NW, in the Cleveland Park neighborhood of Washington, DC.

The Ambassador is Uzoma Emenike.

Chancery
The architects, led by Robert Sponseller of Shalom Baranes Associates, designed the building to represent life in a Nigerian village. It features individual buildings build concentrically around a central courtyard, beneath a common roof.<ref>Forgey, Benjamin. "Walls That Talk, in Harmony ," The Washington Post, March 16, 2002, p. C5.</ref>

Work had begun on a new chancery in the late 1980s, but political instability in Nigeria delayed serious work for nearly a decade. Approved by the National Capital Planning Commission on March 4, 1999, construction was completed in early 2002. It was officially commissioned on May 5, 2003 by Nigerian Vice President Atiku Abubakar.

The Washington chapter of the American Institute of Architects awarded the chancery a 2002 award for excellence in architecture, and it was featured on the cover of the Winter 2003 issue of their magazine, Architecture DC''.

Events
In 2011, there was a protest there about Biafra.

References

External links

Embassy of Nigeria, Washington official site
wikimapia

Nigeria
Washington, D.C.
Buildings and structures completed in 2002
Nigeria–United States relations
2002 establishments in Washington, D.C.
North Cleveland Park